Şipal is a Turkish surname. Notable people with the surname include:

 Onur Şipal (born 1989), Turkish boxer, brother of Önder
 Önder Şipal (born 1987), Turkish boxer

See also
 

Turkish-language surnames